Charles Francis Xavier O'Brien (March 7, 1879 – November 14, 1940) was an American Democratic Party politician. He served as U.S. Representative from New Jersey's 12th Congressional District from 1921 to 1925.

Biography

O'Brien was born in Jersey City, New Jersey, on March 7, 1879. He attended the Jersey City Public Schools, Academy of St. Aloysius Grammar School and Saint Peter's College. He graduated from Fordham University. He studied law at the New York Law School, was admitted to the bar and commenced practice in Jersey City. He was a judge of the second criminal court, and was director of public safety of Jersey City from 1917 to 1921. He was a delegate to the 1920 Democratic National Convention.

O'Brien was elected as a Democrat to the Sixty-seventh and Sixty-eighth Congresses, serving in office from March 4, 1921 to March 3, 1925. He voluntarily retired to accept the position of registrar of records of Hudson County, New Jersey, serving from 1926 to 1936. He was serving in the city law department at the time of his death in Jersey City on November 14, 1940, and was interred in Holy Name Cemetery.

External links

Charles Francis Xavier O'Brien at The Political Graveyard

1879 births
1940 deaths
Fordham University alumni
Democratic Party members of the United States House of Representatives from New Jersey
New Jersey lawyers
New York Law School alumni
Politicians from Jersey City, New Jersey
Saint Peter's University alumni
Burials at Holy Name Cemetery (Jersey City, New Jersey)
Catholics from New Jersey